The United Regions of Serbia (abbr. УРС, URS) was a regionalist, liberal-conservative political party in Serbia. It was founded on 16 May 2010 as a political coalition, and became a unified political party on 21 April 2013. The URS advocated decentralization and was pro-business.

The URS received 5.51% of the popular vote in the 2012 parliamentary election. Following the election, the URS formed a coalition government with the Serbian Progressive Party and Socialist Party of Serbia. On 31 July 2013 the URS was ousted from the government and became opposition.

On 13 November 2015 the party was removed from the register of political parties and ceased to exist, which was controversial because the party had over a million euros of unpaid debt. It had already been defunct for more than a year, according to the former president Mlađan Dinkić.
 Even though the party has been long gone, it has remained in the party register of Serbia since then.

The URS was an associate member of the European People's Party.

Electoral results

Parliamentary elections

Presidential elections

Leadership of the United Regions of Serbia

References

External links

Official website

2010 establishments in Serbia
Conservative parties in Serbia
Defunct political parties in Serbia
International Democrat Union member parties
Liberal parties in Serbia
Liberal conservative parties
Political parties disestablished in 2014
Political parties established in 2013
Pro-European political parties in Serbia